Sławomir Musielak (born 3 June 1990)
 is a Polish motorcycle speedway rider who is a member of the Polish junior national team. Musielak finished 2nd in the 2009 Individual Speedway Junior Polish Championship and was third in the 2009 Silver Helmet Final.

Career details

World Championships 

 Individual U-21 World Championship
 2009 - Lost in Domestic Qualification

European Championships 

 Individual U-19 European Championship
 2009 -  Tarnów - 6th place (9 pts)
 Team U-19 European Championship
 2009 -  Holsted - U-19 European Champion (1 pt)
 European Club Champions' Cup
 2008 - 4th place in the Semi-Final for Leszno

 Domestic competitions 

 Individual Polish Championship
 2008 - track reserve in the Quarter-Final 4 2009 -  Toruń - the Final will be on 25 July (as track reserve) Individual Speedway Junior Polish Championship
 2009 -  Leszno - Runner-up (13 pts + 2nd in Run-Off)
 Team Polish Championship (League)
 2006 - for Leszno
 2007 - did not start 2008 - 1st place in Second League for Gniezno (Average 1.297)
 2009 - for Leszno
 Individual U-21 Polish Championship
 2008 - 12th place in the Semi-Final 2 2009 - the Qualifying Round 3 will be on 15 July''
 Team U-21 Polish Championship
 2008 -  Leszno - Polish Champion for Leszno (9 pts)
 2009 -  Toruń - 3rd place (10 pts)
 Silver Helmet (U-21)
 2008 -  Rzeszów - 11th place (6 pts)
 2009 -  Częstochowa - 3rd place (12+2 pts)
 Bronze Helmet (U-19)
 2008 -  Gdańsk - 10th place (6 pts)
 2009 -  Wrocław - 4th place (12 pts)
 Bolesław Chrobry Tournament
 2008 -  Gniezno - did not start as track reserve

See also 
 Poland national speedway team
 Speedway in Poland

References 

Polish speedway riders
1990 births
Living people
Team Speedway Junior European Champions
People from Kościan
Sportspeople from Greater Poland Voivodeship